The Mark of Zorro is a 1920 American silent Western romance film starring Douglas Fairbanks and Noah Beery. This genre-defining swashbuckler adventure was the first movie version of The Mark of Zorro. Based on the 1919 story The Curse of Capistrano by Johnston McCulley, which introduced the masked hero, Zorro, the screenplay was adapted by Fairbanks (as "Elton Thomas") and Eugene Miller.

The film was produced by Fairbanks for his own production company, Douglas Fairbanks Pictures Corporation, and was the first film released through United Artists, the company formed by Fairbanks, Mary Pickford, Charlie Chaplin, and D. W. Griffith.

Noah Beery Jr. makes his first of many dozens of screen appearance spanning six decades. He portrayed a young child; his father began sporadically billing himself as Noah Beery Sr. as a result.

The film has been remade twice, once in 1940 (starring Tyrone Power) and again in 1974 (starring Frank Langella). In 2015, the United States Library of Congress selected the film for preservation in the National Film Registry, finding it "culturally, historically, or aesthetically significant".

Plot

The Mark of Zorro tells the story of Don Diego Vega, the outwardly foppish son of a wealthy ranchero Don Alejandro in the old Spanish California of the early 19th century. Seeing the mistreatment of the peons by rich landowners and the oppressive colonial government, Don Diego, who is not as effete as he pretends, has taken the identity of the masked Robin Hood-like rogue Señor Zorro ("Mr. Fox"), champion of the people, who appears out of nowhere to protect them from the corrupt administration of Governor Alvarado, his henchman the villainous Captain Juan Ramon and the brutish Sergeant Pedro Gonzales (Noah Beery, Wallace Beery's older half-brother). With his sword flashing and an athletic sense of humor, Zorro scars the faces of evildoers with his mark, "Z".

When not in the disguise of Zorro, dueling and rescuing peons, Don Diego courts the beautiful Lolita Pulido with bad magic tricks and worse manners. She cannot stand him. Lolita is also courted by Captain Ramon; and by the dashing Zorro, whom she likes.

In the end, when Lolita's family is jailed, Don Diego throws off his masquerade, whips out his sword, wins over the soldiers to his side, forces Governor Alvarado to abdicate, and wins the hand of Lolita, who is delighted to discover that her effeminate suitor, Diego, is actually the dashing hero.

Primary cast

 Douglas Fairbanks as Don Diego Vega/Señor Zorro
 Marguerite De La Motte as Lolita Pulido
 Noah Beery Sr. as Sergeant Pedro Gonzales
 Charles Hill Mailes as Don Carlos Pulido
 Claire McDowell as Doña Catalina Pulido
 Robert McKim as Captain Juan Ramon
 George Periolat as Governor Alvarado
 Walt Whitman as Father Felipe
 Sidney De Gray as Don Alejandro Vega
 Tote Du Crow as Bernardo, Don Diego's mute servant
 Noah Beery Jr. as Boy
 Charles Stevens as Peon beaten by Sergeant Gonzales
 Milton Berle (uncredited child)

Reception and impact

The New York Times gave The Mark of Zorro a mixed review.

Fairbanks biographer Jeffrey Vance, assessing the film's legacy in 2008, writes: "The Mark of Zorro is a landmark, not only in the career of Douglas Fairbanks, but also in the development of the action-adventure film. With this, his thirtieth motion picture, Fairbanks was transitioning from comedies to the costume films for which he is best remembered. Instead of reflecting the times, The Mark of Zorro offers an infusion of the romantic past with a contemporary flair ... Beyond reenergizing his career and redefining a genre, Fairbanks's The Mark of Zorro helped popularize one of the enduring creations of twentieth-century American fiction, a character who was the prototype for comic book heroes such as Batman."

The Mark of Zorro was preserved by the Academy Film Archive in 2012.

Batman connection

In the DC Comics continuity, it is established that The Mark of Zorro was the film that the young Bruce Wayne had seen with his parents at a movie theater, moments before they were killed in front of his eyes by an armed thug. Zorro is often portrayed as Bruce's childhood hero and an influence on his Batman persona. There are discrepancies regarding which version Bruce saw: The Dark Knight Returns claims it was the Tyrone Power version, whereas a story by Alan Grant claimed it to be the silent 1920 original. Bill Finger was himself inspired by Fairbanks' Zorro, including similarities in costumes, the "Bat Cave" and Zorro's cave, and unexpected secret identities, especially since the Batman character predates the Tyrone Power remake by a year. The posters for 1940's The Mark of Zorro and the 1981 film Excalibur were used for a scene in Batman v Superman: Dawn of Justice.

In the animated series Justice League Unlimited, a flashback of the fateful night establishes that for DCAU continuity Bruce and his parents were attending The Mark of Zorro but does not indicate which version. In earlier episodes of Batman: The Animated Series, the fictional character the Gray Ghost, a pulp fiction hero inspired by The Shadow, is the inspiration to young Bruce Wayne.

In the Season 5 episode "Ace Chemicals" of Gotham, the villain Jeremiah Valeska films his own version of the film as a way of taunting Bruce Wayne. The credits for his own version begin with the title credits that acknowledge it as Douglas Fairbanks' version.

Despite copyright dates, both Zorro and Batman have been litigated with regard to whether the original material has passed into the public domain. Zorro has been found to be in the public domain in the courts.

References

Further reading
 Tibbetts, John C., and James M. Welsh, eds. The Encyclopedia of Novels Into Film (2nd ed. 2005) pp 82–85.

External links

 
 
 
 AFI entry for The Mark of Zorro
  at The Film Tribune
 
 The Mark of Zorro (1920) A Silent Film Review at Movies Silently, with stills

1920 films
1920 Western (genre) films
1920s romance films
American black-and-white films
American romance films
Articles containing video clips
Films based on works by Johnston McCulley
Films directed by Fred Niblo
Films set in California
Films set in the 1840s
Silent American Western (genre) films
United States National Film Registry films
Zorro films
1920s American films
Silent adventure films
1920s English-language films